Jesse Johnson may refer to:

Jesse Johnson (actor) (born 1982), American actor
Jesse Johnson (keyboardist) (born 1977), American keyboardist of Motion City Soundtrack
Jesse Johnson (musician) (born 1960), American lead guitarist of The Time
Jesse Johnson (New York lawyer) (1842–1918), U.S. Attorney and Associate Justice of the New York Supreme Court
Jesse Johnson (Washington politician) (born 1989/90), Washington state representative
Jesse Johnson (West Virginia politician) (born 1959), activist and perennial candidate
Jesse Johnson Yeates (1829–1892), U.S. Representative from North Carolina
Jesse V. Johnson (born 1971), English stunt coordinator and filmmaker